Primo Filmes, led by Joana Mariani, Matias Mariani and Marcelo Monteiro, has produced the feature-films Drained (O Cheiro do Ralo), Fabricating Tom Zé (Fabricando Tom Zé) and 3.5 Overpass (Elevado 3.5). Matias studied film production at New York University and, after directing the short film Rear View of a City (O Não de São Paulo) has specialized in executive production. Joana, who started out as an assistant-director for advertisement shoots, now dedicates herself to production apart from beginning a direction career with the short-film Day-In, day-Out (Cotidiano). Monteiro has brought to Primo his 7 years experience as a producer for the internet portal Terra.
 
Primo made its film debut with Drained in 2005, which had Matias as the executive producer and Joana as the assistant director. A surprise-hit both in terms of box-office and positive reviews, Drained has been seen by more than 180 thousand people so far, being widely perceived as one of the most successful films of year, representing Brazil in the 2007 Sundance Film Festival. Drained won the 2006 São Paulo International Film Festival and several other awards in festivals around the globe.

Films produced 

O Não de São Paulo (Rear View of a City), short-film, 22min, 35mm (2004)
Special ABDC Jury Award in the Rio de Janeiro International Short-Film Festival 2005
Sonhos de Peixe, feature film, 111min, 35mm (2005)
La Semaine de la Critique 2006 Cannes Film Festival - Official Selection
O Cheiro do Ralo (Drained), feature film, 112min, 35mm (2006)
International Critics Award (Rio de Janeiro International Film Festival 2006)
Special Jury Award (Rio de Janeiro International Film Festival 2006)
Best Actor - Selton Mello (Rio de Janeiro International Film Festival 2006)
Best Film (São Paulo International Film Festival 2006)
Critics Award (São Paulo International Film Festival 2006)
Special Mention to the Cast (São Paulo International Film Festival 2006)
Official Selection (Sundance International Film Festival 2007)
Best Film (Campo Grande Film Festival 2007)
Best Actor - Selton Mello (Punta del Este International Film Festival 2007)
Best Actor - Selton Mello (Guadalajara International Film Festival 2007)
Fabricando Tom Zé (Fabricating Tom Zé), feature film, 90min, 35mm (2006)
Audience Award Best Documentary (Rio de Janeiro International Film Festival 2006)
Audience Award Best Documentary (São Paulo International Film Festival 2006)
Elevado 3.5 (3.5 Overpass), feature film, 75min, video (2007)
Best Film ("It's All True" International Documentary Festival 2007)
Special French Consulate Award ("It's All True" International Documentary Festival 2007)
Cotidiano (Day-In, Day-Out), short-film, 17min, 16mm (2008)
Coda (Coda), short-film (animation), 9min, Pixilation (2008)
Anima Mundi 2008
O Nome do Gato, short-film, 19min, S-16mm (2008)

Film production companies of Brazil